Sony Sports Ten 5 (formerly Sony Six) is an Indian English-language pay television sports channel operated by Culver Max Entertainment. It is part of the Sony Sports Network.

History

Sony SIX was launched in April 2012 by Sony Pictures Networks; initially, the channel focused on programming such as Indian Premier League cricket, UFC mixed martial arts, association football, and badminton, aiming to target a younger audience.

On 24 October 2022, the channel was rebranded as Sony Sports Ten 5, as part of a wider rebranding of all Culver Max Entertainment channels.

Programming

National team cricket

Country Professional Cricket Leagues Rights

References

External links

Sony Pictures Entertainment
Television channels and stations established in 2012
Sony Pictures Networks India
Television stations in Mumbai
2012 establishments in Maharashtra